The governor of Espírito Santo is the chief executive of the Brazilian state of Espírito Santo. Below is a list of governors of the Brazilian state of Espírito Santo, since the creation of this administrative function, along with the proclamation of the Republic in Brazil, until the present day.

The governors of the Brazilian states were called presidents from 1889 to 1934. Then it was decided they should take the title of governors instead, which is the title they use today.

Prior to the proclamation of the Brazilian Republic in 1889, Brazil had no states at all; the country was subdivided into provinces, which administrators were appointed by the emperor in agreement with the provinces' chambers of representatives.

This list was taken and copied directly from the Governors of Espírito Santo's page on Portuguese Wikipedia, and some complementary information added here was taken from the Portuguese version of Britannica Encyclopedia edited in São Paulo, Brazil, 2000. All credit must go to those users from pt.wikipedia.org who created and edited this list, and to Britannica Encyclopedia

References 

 List of Governors of Espírito Santo on the  Portuguese Wikipedia
 Encyclopædia Britannica do Brasil, volume 5, São Paulo, 2000.

Espírito Santo